Friedrich Enzio Busche (April 5, 1930 – May 28, 2020) was the first resident of Germany called as a general authority of the Church of Jesus Christ of Latter-day Saints (LDS Church).

Busche was born in Dortmund, Germany and his family left that area after the beginning of the Second World War. Near the end of the war, Busche was drafted at age 14 into the German Army during the Nazi regime's desperate final push. After the war, Busche returned to Dortmund where he lived in a large part on the molasses that had poured out of a supply train American soldiers had attacked.

After the war, Busche completed high school and then studied at universities in Bonn and Freiberg. He then took over a printing business from his father. Under his direction, the company grew to be one of the larger ones in Germany. It was also one of the few companies in Germany at that time that used a participatory style of leadership.

Busche married Jutta Baum in 1955 and they were the parents of four children.  Together they joined the LDS Church in 1958.

LDS Church service
He served in many local positions within the LDS Church, including as a counselor in the presidency of the Central German Mission. Busche served as regional representative to the German regions in 1973 and spoke at the continental Europe Area conference held that year in Munich.

Busche was called as a member of the church's First Quorum of the Seventy in October 1977.  As a general authority, he served as president of the Germany Munich Mission from 1978 to 1980. From 1987 to 1989, he was president of the Frankfurt Germany Temple. In 2011, he was honored at the Provo, Utah annual Freedom Festival Awards Gala.

In his 1993 general conference address, Truth Is the Issue, he taught, "In the depth of such a prayer, we may finally be led to that lonesome place where we suddenly see ourselves naked in all soberness. Gone are all the little lies of self-defense. We see ourselves in our vanities and false hopes for carnal security. We are shocked to see our many deficiencies, our lack of gratitude for the smallest things. We are now at that sacred place that seemingly only a few have courage to enter, because this is that horrible place of unquenchable pain in fire and burning. This is that place where true repentance is born. This is that place where the conversion and the rebirth of the soul are happening." 

He served as a general authority until October 2000, when he was designated as an emeritus general authority.

Busche died on May 28, 2020 in Bountiful, Utah, at age 90.

Works
Books

References

External links
Elder F. Enzio Buche: To the Ends of the Earth, Ensign, February 1985. 
Gibbons, Francis M. and Daniel Bay Gibbons. A Gathering of Eagles: Conversions From The Four Quarters of the Earth. San Jose: Writers Club Press. 2002. p. 235 ff. 
German Saints at War. p. 5-10. Robert C. Freeman and Jon R. Felt. Springville:CFI, 2008.

1930 births
2020 deaths
Converts to Mormonism
German general authorities (LDS Church)
German Mormon missionaries
Members of the First Quorum of the Seventy (LDS Church)
Mission presidents (LDS Church)
Mormon missionaries in Germany
Businesspeople from Dortmund
Regional representatives of the Twelve
20th-century Mormon missionaries
Temple presidents and matrons (LDS Church)
German Army personnel of World War II
Child soldiers in World War II